HMS Fawn was a Royal Navy 17-gun  sloop launched in 1856.  She served on the Australia, North America and Pacific stations before being converted to a survey ship in 1876.  She was sold and broken up in 1884.

Construction
Fawn was launched on 30 September 1856 from Deptford Dockyard.

Australia station

She was commissioned at Sheerness on 30 October 1859 and until 1863 served on the Australia Station.

North America station
She refitted at Sheerness in 1863, and from 1864 to 1868 served on the North America and West Indies Station (Halifax, Nova Scotia and Bermuda). On 29 May 1866, she was driven ashore. Repairs cost £1,600. Nobody was found to be to blame for the incident.

Pacific station
After a second refit at Sheerness in 1869 she went to the Pacific Station in Esquimalt, British Columbia, where she remained until 1875.

Survey ship
In 1876 she was converted to a survey ship, and in this role she surveyed areas of the east coast of Africa, the Sea of Marmara and the Mediterranean. She was under the command of Commander William Wharton from 1 June 1876 to 1 January 1880 and then under the command of Commander Pelham Aldrich until paying off.

Fate
On 6 April 1883 she paid off, and she was sold for breaking the next year.

References

 

1856 ships
Ships built in Deptford
Cruizer-class sloops
Victorian-era sloops of the United Kingdom
Maritime incidents in May 1866